The Toyota Aurion  is a mid-size car produced by Toyota in Australia and parts of Asia from 2006 to 2017. In the two generations it was produced, the Aurion was derived from the equivalent Camry. Changes were mainly limited to revised front- and rear-end treatment, along with changes to the interior. The Camry-based Aurion was also sold in the majority of East and Southeast Asia as the Toyota Camry, with the original version of the Camry sold alongside the Aurion in Australasia and the Middle East. In the previous two markets, the car replaced the Avalon model, which can trace its roots back to the early 1990s. A total of 111,140 Aurions were sold over the 10 year Australian production span.

The name "Aurion" was derived from Greek word meaning "tomorrow".

First generation (XV40; 2006) 

The first generation Aurion was on sale from 2006 to 2012. In Australia and New Zealand, it replaced the Toyota Avalon (XX10). In some markets this car is referred to as the "prestige" Camry. The Aurion shares most of its tooling, drivetrain, and centre body work, with restyled front and rear ends and interior fittings.

In 2006, Toyota Australia released a heavily enhanced version known as the TRD Aurion, with a supercharged engine and full bodykit.

Pre-facelift

Facelift (2009)

Second generation (XV50; 2011) 

After production started in February 2012, April 2012 saw the release of the second generation Aurion in Australia and New Zealand. The same model designations applied in Australia in tie with the first generation model, those being: AT-X, Sportivo SX6, Sportivo ZR6, Prodigy, and Presara. In New Zealand, the model designations are: AT-X, Touring, and Sportivo SX6.

This nameplate is again based on the Camry. The all new model has been available for some Asian and European markets as a Camry since 2011. The same, separate model designations of the Camry and Aurion are on sale in Australia and New Zealand. For the first time, with the XV50 model, the Japanese market Camry is now based on the same design as the "prestige" Camry or Aurion, rather than the "regular" Camry. The "prestige" Camry was designed in Japan by Hirofumi Fukui, Kazumi Kowaki and Keisuke Matsuno in 2009 and unveiled in Ukraine on 25 August 2011.

Facelift
The Aurion-based Camry, sold in Japan and other Asian markets, received a large facelift in 2014. It was discontinued in Japan in July 2017 and in Southeast Asia in late 2018, and it was replaced by the TNGA-based XV70 Camry.

In Australia, however, the Aurion itself received a much smaller facelift, with little exterior changes. The Prodigy trim was deleted from the range, and the Sportivo SX6 and ZR6 were merged to form a single Sportivo trim. The revised trim for the Australian market were: AT-X, Sportivo and Presara.

Special Editions
In 2012, the Aurion in Australia released the Touring SE variant. Only 1500 were built, all of which were based on the AT-X. It added a rear spoiler, front fog lamps, as well as a sports grille on the exterior. The interior features contained a similar interior as the AT-X, except it included steering wheel with audio controls and sport pedals.

Sales
Sales of the second generation Aurion commenced in Australia in April 2012. Whilst having a slow start, the end of the year saw the car achieve sales in excess of 1,000 units in both November and December 2012. However, with this, the Aurion's sales progressively got less as time went on, leaving some months with as little as 100-200 units.

The following table lists the Australian sales made throughout its tenure.

Replacement/Successor
Production of the second generation Aurion in Australia ended in August 2017, ending Aurion production after almost 11 years. With this, Toyota reintroduced, for the first time since 2006, the V6 Camry. Like the Aurion, the Camry also ceased production at the Altona factory, with an imported model from Japan coming to replace it.

References 

Cars of Australia
Front-wheel-drive vehicles
Mid-size cars
Sedans
Aurion
Cars introduced in 2006
2010s cars